The Mexican Open or Mexico International is an international badminton competition held in Mexico.

The Mexican Open has been held together with the Mexican National Championship of Badminton which main difference is that foreign players can participate in the former competition, while the latter is just reserved for Mexican badminton players. The original intention was that both tournaments would be held annually; however, due to different circumstances it has not always been this the case.

The first tournament was organised by the Mexican Association of Badminton and the Centro Deportivo Chapultepec in 1949 as the Mexico City International Tournament; there were four more editions held in 1952, 1958, 1959 and 1961.

In 1964, the Mexican Association of Badminton changed its official name to the Mexican National Open Championship.

In 2009, the Mexican Association of Badminton decided to start counting the tournaments again; hence, the Mexican Open of 2014 is considered as the fifth Mexican Open.

The Mexican Open is one of the most important Latin American badminton competitions together with the Pan American Badminton Championships and the Pan American Games, and perhaps the oldest international tournament of badminton in Latin America.

The best Mexican players have competed in the Mexican Open, along with foreign badminton players from almost all over the World, some of whom have been already inducted to the World Badminton Hall of Fame such as Erland Kops, while some others have represented their countries in the Thomas Cup and the Uber Cup such as Tan Joe Hok, Channarong Ratanaseangsuang and Carlene Starkey, or being inducted to the Hall of Fame of their own countries such as Don Paup, Jamie Paulson, Tyna Barinaga, Dorothy O´Neil, Helen Tibbetts, and Margaret Varner.

Previous winners

Mexican National Open Championship

Internacional Mexicano/Mexican International

Mexican International Challenge

Mexico Future Series

Performances by nation

Mexican National Open Championship

Internacional Mexicano/Mexican International

Mexican International Challenge

Mexico Future Series

References 

Badminton tournaments in Mexico